Grant Blair (born August 15, 1964) is a Canadian retired ice hockey goaltender who was an All-American for Harvard.

Career
Blair had a fairly charmed junior career, playing on a Burlington Cougars squad that won the Sutherland Cup. The following season he jumped up to Junior-A hockey with the Guelph Platers, and helped the team win the OJHL regular season title, the league championship, the Buckland Cup, the Dudley Hewitt Cup and the Eastern Canada Championship. The team finished as runners-up in the 1982 Centennial Cup for the national Junior-A championship.

Blair arrived in Boston just as Harvard was again becoming a power in college hockey. In his freshman season, Harvard need one of its goaltender to step into the starter's role due to the graduation of Wade Lau. Blair quickly established himself in goal and backstopped the Crimson to its best finish in eight years. Blair allowed less than 2 goals per game in Harvard's first conference championship in twelve years and the team returned to the NCAA Tournament. The top-seeded Crimson squeaked by Michigan State in the quarterfinals and then downed Minnesota to make their first ever appearance in the NCAA Championship Game. While Harvard was soundly defeated by Wisconsin, Blair had performed so well during the season that he was selected by the Calgary Flames in the 1983 NHL Entry Draft.

Graduations took their toll on Harvard the following season and, though they won their division, the team finished below .500 with paltry offense. Blair's numbers were only slightly worse, however, and he led Harvard to having the #2 defense in the conference. After Blair's sophomore season, several teams from ECAC Hockey left to form a new conference, Hockey East. That, compiled with the team's offense recovering, enabled the Crimson to finish second in their conference in 1985. Blair's heroics helped the team finish with one of the top defenses in the country and was 4th in the nation with a 2.89 goals against average. While Harvard made the NCAA tournament once more, they lost both of their quarterfinal games.

As a senior, Blair was even better for Harvard. He set numerous career records for the program as well as several single-season highs. Most have since been surpassed but his name still appears all of Harvard's record book. Blair led the team to a first-place finish, their first since 1975, and though the team was upset in the conference semifinal, they did receive an at-large bid to the 1986 NCAA Tournament. Harvard and Blair were dominant through their first three games, charging into their second NCAA title game with their eye on the crown. The game began well for Harvard and the Crimson had a lead after each of the first two periods, but Michigan State would not go away and the Spartans' powerful offense began wearing down the Crimson D. MSU scored three goals in the third, the last with under 3 minutes to play, and Harvard could not fins the equalizer before time ran out. Despite being named an All-American, Blair could not lift Harvard to an elusive championship and left the program as the all-time winningest goaltender, a position he still holds as of 2021.

After graduating, Blair played two seasons of professional hockey in the IHL before hanging up his pads in 1988.

Statistics

Regular season and playoffs

Awards and honors

References

External links
 

1964 births
Living people
AHCA Division I men's ice hockey All-Americans
Calgary Flames draft picks
Canadian ice hockey goaltenders
Ice hockey people from Ontario
Harvard Crimson men's ice hockey players
Kalamazoo Wings (1974–2000) players
Salt Lake Golden Eagles (IHL) players
Sportspeople from Hamilton, Ontario